Armand Bayou is a bayou in U.S. State of Texas. It runs near Galveston Bay in Pasadena and the Clear Lake Area.

The bayou is best known for the Armand Bayou Nature Center, through which it runs. The bayou and the nature center were named for Armand Yramategui, former curator of the Burke Baker Planetarium and environmental leader during the 1960s.

State Representative Dennis Paul, before he took office, was among those who worked with community leaders to clean up the bayou before the United States Environmental Protection Agency ordered a national solution to what Paul otherwise viewed as "a local problem."

See also
List of rivers of Texas

References

 Texas State Historical Association.

USGS Geographic Names Information Service
USGS Hydrologic Unit Map - State of Texas (1974)

Rivers of Texas
Galveston Bay Area
Rivers of Houston